Uberella is a genus of sea snails, marine gastropod molluscs in the family Naticidae, the moon snails.

Species
Species within the genus Uberella include:
 Uberella alacris Dell, 1956:
 Uberella barrierensis (Marwick, 1924)
 Uberella denticulifera (Marwick, 1924)
 † Uberella keyesi Marwick, 1965 
 † Uberella maesta (Marwick, 1924) 
 † Uberella marwicki Powell, 1935 
 † Uberella pseudovitrea (Finlay, 1924) 
 † Uberella pukeuriensis (Marwick, 1924) 
 Uberella simulans (E.A. Smith, 1906)
 Uberella vitrea (Hutton, 1873)
 Species brought into synonymy
 Uberella alacris Dell, 1956: synonym of Glossaulax aulacoglossa (Pilsbry & Vanatta, 1909)

References 

 Powell A. W. B. (1979), New Zealand Mollusca, William Collins Publishers Ltd, Auckland, New Zealand 
 Torigoe K. & Inaba A. (2011) Revision on the classification of Recent Naticidae. Bulletin of the Nishinomiya Shell Museum 7: 133 + 15 pp., 4 pls

Naticidae
Gastropods of New Zealand
Extant Miocene first appearances
Taxa named by Harold John Finlay